The FS Class D.341 is a class of diesel-electric locomotive used in Italy, introduced in the 1950s and still in service. Most of the remaining units are in service with La Ferroviaria Italiana (LFI).

History
The D.341 were part of a post-World War II effort from the Italian state railways FS to replace their steam locomotives on non-electrified lines. They were designed in collaboration with Fiat and Breda and were produced in two series with different engines, depending from the manufacturer. The second series had a slightly different appearance. Two prototypes were also built by Ansaldo and Reggiane.

Description
D.341 has two small cabs, one at each end, separated by a large compartment including the engine, the cooling devices and the transmission. The two engines were each V-12 engines coupled to a DC 450/700 V generator provided by Magneti Marelli for the FIAT locomotives, and by Breda or Ocren in the others.

References

D.341
Bo′Bo′ locomotives
Railway locomotives introduced in 1957
Gio. Ansaldo & C. locomotives
Breda locomotives
Reggiane locomotives
Standard gauge locomotives of Italy
Freight locomotives